Mount Washington is a mountain on the eastern edge of the Vancouver Island Ranges of British Columbia and the site of Mount Washington Alpine Resort, popular for skiing and many other activities.

The mountain was named after Rear Admiral John Washington, official Hydrographer, British Royal Navy, by Captain George Richards while charting the West Coast in the 1860s. 

In addition to winter skiing, in the summer Mount Washington has many trails for mountain bikers, and offers scenic chair lifts and hiking trails to visitors.

Mount Washington is home to the Vancouver Island marmot, one of the planet's most endangered mammals. Found in the wild only on Vancouver Island in British Columbia, the marmot differs significantly from other marmot species. In an effort to increase Vancouver Island marmot populations, the Vancouver Island Marmot Recovery Foundation has established captive breeding facilities across Canada.  The largest of these is the Tony Barrett Marmot Recovery Centre located on Mount Washington.

The following broadcasting stations have their transmitter sites on the east face of Mount Washington, facing out over the Comox Valley and Campbell River:
 CKLR-FM, 97.3 MHz
 CFCP-FM, 98.9 MHz
 CHAN-TV-4, channel 11
 CHEK-TV-5, channel 13
Several amateur radio repeaters are also located on Mount Washington.

References

External links
 Mount Washington at Bivouac.com
 Mount Washington Homepage
 The Vancouver Island Marmot
 Tourism Mount Washington

Washington, Mount
Washington, Mount
Washington
Comox Land District